William David Christian (born January 29, 1938) is an American former ice hockey player.  He led the United States to a gold medal at the 1960 Winter Olympics.  He was inducted into the United States Hockey Hall of Fame in 1984 and the International Ice Hockey Federation Hall of Fame in 1998.

Career
Christian played prep school hockey at Warroad High School where he led the team to the 1953 state tournament finals. Christian then attended the University of Minnesota. However, since freshman were not allowed to join varsity sports teams at the time, Christian describes it as a “lost season.” After one year at the University of Minnesota, Christian joined the United States National Team. He led the United States to a gold medal at the 1960 Winter Olympics. During the Olympics, Christian led the team with seven goals and five assists as they became the first American team to play in the Soviet Union. After the Olympics, Christian had a brief professional tryout with the minor league Seattle Totems but chose to remain an amateur, returning to build houses in Minnesota instead. He kept playing for the Warroad Lakers for 23 years before retiring after the 1980 season. Four years later, in 1984, he was inducted into the United States Hockey Hall of Fame.

In 1998, Christian was inducted into the International Ice Hockey Federation Hall of Fame as a player.

In 2016, both Christian and his son Dave auctioned off their gold medals with Heritage Auctions.

Personal life
Christian comes from a hockey playing family. Both Roger and Gordon Christian played for Team USA at the Olympic Games. His son, Dave Christian, was a member of the U.S. Olympic Hockey Team, at the 1980 Winter Olympics that also won a gold medal before embarking on a successful professional career in the National Hockey League between 1980 and 1995. His grandson, Brock Nelson, is a member of the New York Islanders of the NHL.

The Christian brothers father was a carpenter. In 1964, Christian and his brother Roger began a wooden hockey stick business called "Christian Brothers Hockey Company." The company was eventually bought out by Harrow in 2009.

See also
List of Olympic medalist families

References

1938 births
American men's ice hockey players
Ice hockey players from Minnesota
Ice hockey players at the 1960 Winter Olympics
Ice hockey players at the 1964 Winter Olympics
IIHF Hall of Fame inductees
Living people
Medalists at the 1960 Winter Olympics
Olympic gold medalists for the United States in ice hockey
People from Warroad, Minnesota
Warroad Lakers players
United States Hockey Hall of Fame inductees